Ohrdruf is a town in the German state of Thuringia.

Ohrdruf may also refer to:

 Ohrdruf concentration camp
 Ohrdruf Priory

See also
 Michaeliskirche (Ohrdruf)